Gabriel Landeskog (born 23 November 1992) is a Swedish professional ice hockey left winger and captain of the Colorado Avalanche of the National Hockey League (NHL). 

He was selected second overall in the 2011 NHL Entry Draft by Colorado. On 4 September 2012, Landeskog was named the fourth captain in Colorado Avalanche history, at the time becoming the youngest captain in NHL history at 19 years and 286 days. He won the Stanley Cup with the Colorado Avalanche in 2022, becoming the fourth European-born captain to do so.

Playing career

Djurgårdens IF
Landeskog began his youth career in hockey playing for Hammarby IF. After a successful season for Djurgårdens IF in the J20 SuperElit, Landeskog debuted in Elitserien on 21 February 2009, in a game against Brynäs IF, which Djurgården lost 2–4. At age 16 years and 90 days he became the youngest player in Djurgården's history, and one of the youngest to ever have played in Elitserien. He recorded his first point in Elitserien on 24 February in his second game, a 2–2 tie against Skellefteå AIK.

Kitchener Rangers

Landeskog was initially drafted in the first round, third overall, by the Plymouth Whalers of the Ontario Hockey League in the 2009 Canadian Hockey League Import Draft. On August 4th 2009, his CHL rights were traded from the Whalers to the Kitchener Rangers.

In the 2009–10 season Landeskog roomed with Jeff Skinner, now a member of the Buffalo Sabres. By the end of the year, Landeskog was third among OHL rookies in points (trailing Matt Puempel and Boone Jenner) and goals (trailing Puempel and Ivan Telegin). In the playoffs, Kitchener made it to the conference finals where they were eliminated by Windsor, and Gabriel was third overall on his team as well as the highest scoring rookie ahead of teammate Ryan Murphy.

On 24 October 2010 Landeskog was named captain of the Kitchener Rangers for the 2010–11 season. This announcement made him the first European captain in franchise history. During his final season before NHL draft eligibility, despite suffering an ankle injury which shortened his campaign to 53 regular season games, he led all Rangers with 37 goals and a plus-minus of 27. During the playoffs, Landeskog posted a team-high 10 points in a seven-game first-round series defeat to the Plymouth Whalers to end his junior career.

Colorado Avalanche
Landeskog was drafted second overall by the Colorado Avalanche in the 2011 NHL Entry Draft. He is tied with Daniel Sedin of the Vancouver Canucks  and Victor Hedman of the Tampa Bay Lightning as the third-highest Swedish draft pick in history – Mats Sundin and Rasmus Dahlin are the only Swedish players to be selected first overall in the draft. Landeskog became the first Swedish-born player ever drafted in the first-round out of the Ontario Hockey League (Rickard Rakell would be selected 30th overall in the same draft). Subsequently, the Kitchener Rangers dropped him from their roster to free up a position on their roster on the anticipation he would be playing in the NHL the next year. He made the Avalanche roster for the 2011–12 season; one factor in this decision was possibly that it enabled the team to reach the floor value for the salary cap.

Landeskog scored his first National Hockey League goal on 12 October 2011 against Steve Mason of the Columbus Blue Jackets on a deflection of a Jan Hejda shot with 41 seconds left in the game to send the game into overtime. At 18 years, 324 days, he was the youngest Swedish born hockey player to score an NHL goal. Since, Carolina Hurricanes Forward, Elias Lindholm broke Landeskog's record by scoring his first NHL Goal at 18 years and 311 days. Landeskog was the first rookie to score his first NHL goal as an equalizer in the final minute of the third period since Tom Gilbert of the Edmonton Oilers did it in 2007. On 22 October 2011, he compiled his first two-goal NHL game in a 5–4 shootout victory against the Chicago Blackhawks. Landeskog's second goal tied the game with 1:48 left to go in the 3rd period, sending the game into overtime and an eventual shootout. Landeskog recorded his first five-minute major for fighting, against newly acquired opponent Jack Johnson of the Columbus Blue Jackets on 1 March 2012. On 1 March 2012, Landeskog was named NHL's Top Rookie for the month of February after scoring seven goals and recording six assists for the month.

Landeskog finished his season with 52 points, including a team-leading 22 goals, surpassing Matt Duchene as the youngest in franchise history to do so. He also tied for the lead in points amongst rookies alongside the only player in his draft class picked higher than himself, first overall pick Ryan Nugent-Hopkins. He led rookies in shots on goal and broke Peter Stastny's franchise record for shots on goal by a rookie. Landeskog was the only Av to play in all 82 regular season games in 2011–12 and was later announced at the NHL awards ceremony as the winner of the Calder Memorial Trophy as rookie of the year for 2012, beating out other nominees Ryan Nugent-Hopkins and Adam Henrique for the award.

On 4 September 2012, the Colorado Avalanche announced Landeskog as team captain, at the time making him the youngest captain in NHL history. At 19 years and 286 days (or 19 years, nine months and 13 days), Landeskog was 11 days younger than when Sidney Crosby was named captain of the Pittsburgh Penguins. On 5 October 2016, Connor McDavid of the Edmonton Oilers became the youngest captain in league history surpassing Landeskog's mark by 20 days. However, because of the NHL lockout, he wouldn't be able to play a game as captain until 19 January 2013. When the 2012–13 NHL lockout was in effect, Landeskog returned to Sweden to begin the season with Djurgården, who were relegated the previous season from the Elitserien to the HockeyAllsvenskan. In 17 games with the mid-table Djurgården, Landeskog produced 6 goals for 14 points before returning to North America citing income tax issues on 3 December 2012. He trained with his former junior team, the Kitchener Rangers before an agreement was reached to end the lockout.

During the 2012–13 season, both Landeskog and the Avalanche struggled as the team finished last in the Western Conference. Landeskog only played in 36 games due to head and leg injuries and produced only 9 goals and 8 assists. Despite this, the Avalanche signed Landeskog to seven-year extension worth US$39 million during the off-season.

Landeskog proved to be a significant piece of a resurgent Colorado Avalanche team during the 2013–14 season. He put up career highs in goals, assists, and points, helping the Avs to a division title. He scored his first career NHL playoff goal on 17 April 2014, against Ilya Bryzgalov of the Minnesota Wild.

Landeskog recorded his first career hat trick in a 6–2 win over the Washington Capitals on 17 November 2017. He recorded his second career hat trick the following month in a 6–5 loss to the Tampa Bay Lightning. The Avalanche qualified for the 2018 Stanley Cup playoffs but lost to the Nashville Predators in six games.

Landeskog recorded his third career hat trick in a 5–3 win over the New Jersey Devils on 18 October 2018. Landeskog ended the week leading the NHL in goals and was selected as the NHL's first Star of the Week. He was later one of three Avalanche players who were selected to participate in the 2019 NHL All-Star Game. It was the first NHL All-Star Game of his career. He would finish the 2018–19 NHL season with a career-high 34 goals and 41 assists.

On 27 July 2021, the day before becoming a free agent for the first time his NHL career, Landeskog signed an eight-year, $56 million contract extension to stay with the Avalanche. After a strong beginning to the 2021–22 season, in early March it was announced that Landeskog would undergo knee surgery in order to deal with a "nagging" for some time. At the time he was the Avalanche's leading goal-scorer for the season. He was sufficiently recovered from surgery by the beginning of May to return in time for the 2022 Stanley Cup playoffs. Landeskog was a strong performer through the first three rounds of the playoffs, helping the Avalanche advance to the Western Conference Final for the first time since 2002. He recorded 8 goals and 9 assists in his first fourteen playoff games. The Avalanche defeated the Edmonton Oilers in the conference final, qualifying for the 2022 Stanley Cup Finals. They won the Stanley Cup on June 26, 2022, defeating the two-time defending champion Tampa Bay Lightning in six games.

Landeskog missed the first three games of the 2022–23 season due to an unspecified lower body injury. It was then announced that he had undergone arthroscopic knee surgery and was expected to miss at least twelve weeks.

International play

In December 2009 Landeskog was left off Sweden's roster for the 2010 World Junior Championships.

Landeskog's rise was rewarded the following season as he was named as an alternate captain at the 2011 World Junior Championships but only played one game before he was sidelined with a high ankle sprain.

Landeskog played in the 2012 World Championships and was named an alternate captain for that tournament (Daniel Alfredsson was named captain). Gabriel was Sweden's second youngest player participating at the tournament, about eight months older than Jonas Brodin. Upon the conclusion of his second consecutive season with the Avalanche out of the playoffs, Landeskog was added to the Swedish squad for the 2013 World Championships. In 10 games, Landeskog contributed with 3 goals and 4 points in helping Sweden claim the Gold over Switzerland, becoming the first host team in 27 years to do so.

In July 2013 Landeskog was one of 35 players invited to the Swedish Ice Hockey Federation's Orientation Camp for the 2014 Winter Olympics in Sochi. He was later included in the final squad and helped Sweden claim a Silver medal in a 3–0 defeat to defending champions Canada.

Personal life
Landeskog is the son of former Swedish Hockey League (SHL) defenceman Tony Landeskog, who currently works in the insurance business; his mother Cecelia is a chef and cooking instructor. He has an older brother, Adam Landeskog, born in 1990, as well as a twin sister Beatrice in Stockholm, Sweden. He moved to Canada by himself at age 16 in time for the 2009–10 OHL season.

Landeskog and his wife have two children.

Career statistics

Regular season and playoffs

International

Awards and honours

References

External links
 

1992 births
Calder Trophy winners
Colorado Avalanche draft picks
Colorado Avalanche players
Djurgårdens IF Hockey players
Ice hockey players at the 2014 Winter Olympics
Kitchener Rangers players
Living people
Medalists at the 2014 Winter Olympics
National Hockey League first-round draft picks
Olympic ice hockey players of Sweden
Olympic medalists in ice hockey
Olympic silver medalists for Sweden
Stanley Cup champions
Ice hockey people from Stockholm
Swedish expatriate ice hockey players in the United States
Swedish ice hockey left wingers
Swedish expatriate ice hockey players in Canada